Mian Gavaber (also Romanized as Mīān Gavāber; also known as Miyangaver) is a village in Ahandan Rural District, in the Central District of Lahijan County, Gilan Province, Iran. At the 2006 census, its population was 18, in 4 families.

References 

Populated places in Lahijan County